Fang County or Fangxian is a county of northwestern Hubei province, People's Republic of China. It is under the administration of Shiyan City.

History 
During the Spring and Autumn period, the region was known as Fangzhu.

During the Warring States period, the area belonged to the State of Chu.

In 1277, Fang Prefecture was changed to Fang County, which it has remained since.

Republic of China 

In 1931, the area was re-organized as the 11th  of Hubei Province. In 1936, it was changed to be under the 8th Administrative Inspectorate of Hubei Province.

People's Republic of China 

In 1994, the county was moved to the jurisdiction of the newly-formed prefecture-level city of Shiyan.

Geography 
The Wudang Mountains run through the northern part of Fang County, and the Daba Mountains run through its southern part.

Climate

Administrative divisions
Fang County administers 12 towns and 8 townships.

Former divisions 
In March 2012, Langkou Township was abolished, and merged into the town of Yinjifu.

Economy 
Mineral deposits in the county include copper, iron, lead, zinc, phosphorus, sulfur, coal, and gypsum.

A number of large caves in Fang County also serve as tourist attractions.

Transport 
National Highway 209 runs through the county.

References

Counties of Hubei
Shiyan